Franco Cortese (10 February 1903 in Oggebbio, Piedmont – 13 November 1986 in Milan) was an Italian racing driver. He entered 156 races between 1927 and 1958, of which one was a Formula 1 Grand Prix and three were Formula 2 Grands Prix. Cortese holds the record of most finishes in a Mille Miglia race: fourteen.

Besides having entered many races in an Alfa Romeo, Cortese became most famous for his affiliation with Ferrari between 1947 and 1949, driving the first race car built by Ferrari in 1947, the Ferrari 125 S, which brought victories at four races in 1947. In 1950 he co-founded the Formula One team Scuderia Ambrosiana with Giovanni Lurani, Luigi Villoresi and Eugenio Minetti.

Complete results

References 

1903 births
1986 deaths
Sportspeople from the Province of Verbano-Cusio-Ossola
Italian racing drivers
Ferrari people
24 Hours of Le Mans drivers
Mille Miglia drivers
Italian Formula One drivers
Formula One team owners
Italian motorsport people
European Championship drivers